Denise Coates  (born 26 September 1967) is a British billionaire businesswoman, the founder, majority shareholder and joint chief executive of online gambling company Bet365.

In October 2019, Forbes magazine estimated Coates's net worth at $12.2 billion. In 2020, she earned a salary of £422 million and dividends of £48 million. As of 2021, she has been the highest paid chief executive in Britain for several years, and is one of the wealthiest women in Britain, according to the Sunday Times Rich list.

Early life
Denise Coates was born the eldest daughter of Peter Coates, chairman of Stoke City F.C. and a director of Bet365. She earned a first class degree in econometrics from the University of Sheffield.

Business career
While at school, Coates started work in the cashiers' department of Provincial Racing, a bookmaking firm owned by her family. After leaving university, she continued to work at Provincial Racing, as an accountant. Following this, Coates became managing director over the small chain of shops in 1995. That same year, Coates obtained a loan from Barclays to acquire a neighbouring chain.

Bet365
In January 2000, Coates purchased the domain name Bet365.com. Bet365.com was launched in 2001 as an online betting site. The business borrowed £15 million from RBS against the family's betting shop estate. In 2005, these shops were sold to Coral for £40 million, which allowed Coates to pay off the loan to RBS.

As of 2016, Bet365 is one of the world's largest online gambling companies, with $2 billion in revenues and facilitating $45 billion in yearly bets. The company also owns a majority stake in Stoke City Football Club. In 2015, Bet365 moved its headquarters from Stoke to Gibraltar because of its favourable regulations. Coates still runs the company alongside her brother, and co-CEO, John Coates.

Coates owns around half of Bet365. Her personal fortune is estimated at $5.2 billion, as of December 2022.

In 2017, Coates was criticised for paying herself £217 million, with Mike Dixon, CEO of Addaction, saying "It cannot be right that the CEO of a betting company is paid 22 times more than the whole industry ‘donates’ to treatment." In 2018, it was announced that her salary had increased to £265 million, around 9,500 times more than the average UK salary, with Luke Hildyard of the High Pay Centre commenting, "Obviously, people who build successful companies need to be rewarded for their hard work, but this is an obscene amount of money for someone who is already a billionaire. It's weird to think that someone so rich would want to get their hands on even more, rather than put it to a more useful purpose." Her salary of £421 million in 2020 was 50% higher than it was in 2019, and higher than all FTSE 100 Index CEOs combined.

Denise Coates Foundation
Coates set up the Bet365 Foundation in August 2012. In February 2016 it was renamed Denise Coates Foundation. It is a registered charity under English law and it donated £100 million to twenty UK charities as of 2014. In 2022 the charity donated £1 million to help families in Ukraine. 

Charities which have received funds include Oxfam, CAFOD, the Douglas Macmillan Hospice for cancer sufferers in Stoke, and relief programmes for victims caught in the aftermath of Typhoon Haiyan in the Philippines. University scholarships and theatre donations have also been offered.

The Foundation pledged £230,000 to St Joseph's College, in Trent Vale, for the school's work to help support vulnerable young people in Bo, Sierra Leone.

In March 2020 a donation of £235,000 was made by the foundation to The New Vic Theatre in Newcastle-under-Lyme for essential refurbishment and redevelopment.

In April 2020 Coates donated £10 million through her foundation to University Hospitals of North Midlands to support staff fighting coronavirus.

Personal life
Coates is married to Richard Smith, and they live in Betchton near Sandbach, Cheshire. She drives an Aston Martin with personalised number plates bearing her initials.

They have five children, four of whom were reported in March 2014 as having being "recently adopted from the same family".

Honours and awards
In January 2012, Coates was appointed a Commander of the Order of the British Empire (CBE) for services to the community and business. In 2012, she received an honorary doctorate from Staffordshire University.

In 2013, Coates was named as one of the 100 most powerful women in the UK by Woman's Hour on BBC Radio 4.

In 2019, Coates was inducted to the Sports Betting Hall of Fame run by Sports Betting Community (SBC) for her leadership in the gambling industry.

References

1967 births
Living people
Alumni of the University of Sheffield
Bookmakers
British billionaires
British technology company founders
British women chief executives
Commanders of the Order of the British Empire
English autobiographers
English chief executives
Female billionaires
People from Sandbach
People from Stoke-on-Trent
Women autobiographers
British women company founders
Denise